Moshe Gaolaolwe (born 25 December 1993) is a Botswana football defender.

References

1993 births
Living people
Botswana footballers
Botswana international footballers
Gilport Lions F.C. players
Botswana Defence Force XI F.C. players
Township Rollers F.C. players
TS Galaxy F.C. players
Association football defenders
Botswana expatriate footballers
Expatriate soccer players in South Africa
Botswana expatriate sportspeople in South Africa
National First Division players